Benedenkerk is a town in the Dutch province of South Holland. It is a part of the municipality of Krimpenerwaard, and lies about 6 km south of Gouda.

The statistical area "Benedenkerk", which also can include the surrounding countryside, has a population of around 260.

Until 2015, Benedenkerk was part of Vlist.

References

Populated places in South Holland
Krimpenerwaard